The University of Helsinki metro station is a station on the Helsinki Metro. It serves the University of Helsinki and surrounding areas in the central Helsinki districts Kaisaniemi and Kluuvi. From 1995 to 2015, the station's name was Kaisaniemi. The station is 27 metres below ground level and 22 metres below sea level. It is positioned 600 metres east of the Central Railway Station and 900 metres south of Hakaniemi. Both lines M1 and M2 serve the station.

History 
The location of the metro station was decided in 1971, and the station box was excavated during the metro's original construction work in the late 1970s. The station's opening date was postponed due to a lack of funds. The station was eventually opened on the 1st of March 1995, having been designed by the architect firm Kontio - Kilpi - Valjento Oy. The station is equipped with a glass-sided funicular-style elevator, operating along the slope parallel to the escalators.

Renaming 
In April 2014, the city council voted to rename the station from Kaisaniemi to University of Helsinki. The rebranding was completed in January 2015 to commemorate the university's 375th anniversary. This metro station is one of two comprising the system to be named after a university; the other one is Aalto University.

References

External links

Helsinki Metro stations
Railway stations opened in 1995
1995 establishments in Finland
Kluuvi